Speakers of the Upper House of the Althing.

In 1991, the Althing became unicameral.

Sources
 The official website of the Althing

Main1
Althing
Althing